Cédric Varrault (born 30 January 1980) is a French football defender who plays for JS Saint-Jean Beaulieu.

Honours
Nice
Coupe de la Ligue runners-up: 2006

References

External links

1980 births
Living people
Sportspeople from Blois
Association football fullbacks
French footballers
French expatriate footballers
OGC Nice players
AS Saint-Étienne players
Panionios F.C. players
Dijon FCO players
Ligue 1 players
Ligue 2 players
Super League Greece players
Expatriate footballers in Greece
French expatriate sportspeople in Greece
Footballers from Centre-Val de Loire